Urva is a village in the Pınarbaşı District of Kastamonu Province in Turkey. Its population is 121 (2021).

References

Villages in Pınarbaşı District, Kastamonu